Steve Boyland is a former association football player who represented New Zealand at international level.

Boyland made a solitary official international appearance for New Zealand in a 0–0 draw with Iran on 12 August 1973.

References 

Year of birth missing (living people)
Living people
New Zealand association footballers
New Zealand international footballers
Stop Out players
Association footballers not categorized by position